Elena Schegaleva is a Russian football midfielder, who played for WFC Rossiyanka in the Russian Championship. She previously played for ShVSM Izmailovo.

She was a member of the Russian team that won the 2005 U-19 European Championship. She has four international caps.

References

1987 births
Living people
People from Olonets
Russian women's footballers
Russia women's international footballers
CSP Izmailovo players
WFC Rossiyanka players
Women's association football midfielders
Sportspeople from the Republic of Karelia